Liesel Pritzker Simmons (born Liesel Anne Pritzker), stage name Liesel Matthews, is an American heiress and former child actress. She starred as Sara Crewe in A Little Princess, a 1995 film adaptation of the Frances Hodgson Burnett classic, and as Alice Marshall in Air Force One. She is a member of the wealthy Pritzker family. She is now known as a leader in impact investing and founded the Blue Haven Initiative in 2012 to that end.

Early life and education
Liesel Anne Pritzker was born in Chicago, Illinois, into the wealthy Pritzker family, the daughter of Irene (née Dryburgh) and Robert Pritzker. Her father founded The Marmon Group with his brother Jay Pritzker. She is of Jewish origin on her father's side and her mother is Australian. Her mother met her father while working at a Pritzker-owned Hyatt hotel in Australia; they married in 1980 and divorced in 1989. She has one brother, Matthew Pritzker, and three half-siblings from her father's first marriage to Audrey Gilbert Pritzker: Jennifer N. Pritzker; Linda Pritzker; and Karen Pritzker Vlock. She was named after the Sound of Music character Liesl von Trapp, the eldest daughter of the seven von Trapp children. She is one of twelve surviving grandchildren of patriarch A.N. Pritzker, a financier and industrialist who died in 1986. Her uncle, Jay Pritzker, is the founder of the Hyatt Hotel chain, and owned Braniff Airlines from 1983–1988. Her cousin is J. B. Pritzker, the 43rd Governor of Illinois. The family controls the TransUnion Credit Bureau and the Royal Caribbean Cruise Lines. The Pritzker family has been near the top of Forbes magazine's "America's Richest Families" list since the list began in 1982. Pritzker graduated from New Trier High School outside of Chicago and enrolled at Columbia University, from which she graduated in 2006.

Acting career
Liesel Pritzker uses the name "Liesel Matthews" as an actress on stage and screen, first to honor her brother Matthew, and second to avoid conflict between her divorced parents about whether she should incorporate her stepfather's name and be known as  Liesel Pritzker-Bagley.

Pritzker made her professional stage debut as Scout in a production of To Kill A Mockingbird in Chicago. She won a Theatre World Award for her performance in Vincent in Brixton. She starred in two major films, Alfonso Cuaron's A Little Princess and Wolfgang Petersen's 1997 action thriller Air Force One.

In 2002, Pritzker played the character Jenn in Neil Labute's play The Distance from Here at the Almeida Theatre at King's Cross in London, England with Enrico Colantoni, Ana Reeder, Amy Ryan, Jason Ritter, and Mark Webber in the cast. David Leveaux was director.

Lawsuit
In 2002, Pritzker, then a first-year student at Columbia University, filed a $6 billion lawsuit against her father and eleven older cousins, claiming they had misappropriated money from trusts established for her and her brother Matthew Pritzker. In early 2005, the parties settled the lawsuit, which followed another suit that had begun the process of splitting the family fortune eleven ways. That result placed eleven Pritzkers into the Forbes 400, the most from any single family. Under the settlement, Liesel and Matthew each received roughly U.S. $280 million in cash and were given more control over other trusts valued at about U.S. $170 million each.

Philanthropy and projects
Liesel Pritzker is the founder of Young Ambassadors for Opportunity (YAO), a network of young professionals who aim to inspire, educate, and involve others in microfinance and the work of Opportunity International. In June 2009, she donated $4 million to Opportunity International to help expand microfinance services in Africa. She is the co-founder of the IDP Foundation, Inc., and Blue Haven Initiative.

Personal life
Pritzker is married to Ian Simmons; they live in the Boston, Massachusetts area.

Filmography

References

External links
 
 Young Ambassadors for Opportunity
 Profile on Synergos Board of Directors

1984 births
Living people
20th-century American actresses
21st-century American Jews
21st-century American women
Actresses from Chicago
American child actresses
American film actresses
American stage actresses
American people of Australian descent
American people of Ukrainian-Jewish descent
Columbia College (New York) alumni
New Trier High School alumni
Philanthropists from Illinois
Liesel